El Objeto Antes Llamado Disco is the seventh studio album released by Mexican band, Café Tacuba, on October 22, 2012. In this album, the band has once again collaborated with award-winning Argentine music producer Gustavo Santaolalla.

The album's first single release was "De Este Lado del Camino" 
(From This Side of the Path)

Track listing

Personnel
Zopilotes de Alas Blancas y Cabeza Negra (Rubén Albarrán) - vocals, guitars
Emmanuel del Real - keyboards, programming, percussion, vocals
Joselo Rangel - guitar, vocals
Quique Rangel - bass, ukulele

Chart and certifications

Album certification

References

2012 albums
Café Tacuba albums
Latin Grammy Award for Best Long Form Music Video
Spanish-language live albums
Albums produced by Gustavo Santaolalla